Verhoef is a Dutch toponymic surname. The name is a contraction of van der Hoef, meaning "from the homestead". Notable people with the surname include:

Chris Verhoef (born 1962), Dutch computer scientist
 (born 1968), Dutch writer
Maartje Verhoef (born 1997), Dutch fashion model
Pieter Verhoef (1914–2013), South African theologian
Schalk Verhoef (1935–1997), Dutch cyclist
Toon Verhoef (born 1946), Dutch painter, ceramist and art lecturer

See also
Verhoeff
Verhoeven

References

Dutch-language surnames
Toponymic surnames